Federal Highway 93D is a toll highway in Guerrero. It connects the cities of Chilpancingo and Tixtla de Guerrero. The road is operated by Caminos y Puentes Federales, which in 2011 charged cars 20 pesos to travel Highway 93D.

The road has been referred to as the "corridor of death" due to the frequent findings of murdered bodies in the area.

References 

Mexican Federal Highways